Uladzimir Ignatik was the defending champion but lost in the first round to Alexey Vatutin.

Vasek Pospisil won the title after defeating Ričardas Berankis 6–1, 6–2 in the final.

Seeds

Draw

Finals

Top half

Bottom half

References
Main Draw
Qualifying Draw

Open de Rennes - Singles
2018 Singles